David Raagaard Jensen (born 25 March 1992) is a Danish professional footballer who plays as a goalkeeper for Süper Lig club İstanbulspor. He has amassed a total 32 youth caps for Denmark under five different age groups.

Early life
Jensen was born in Hillerød, Denmark, he began his youth career at Hillerød G&IF before going on to Nordsjælland where he has played since he was 13 years old, signing his first contract with the club at age 16. He would later go on trial with Celtic, but decided against a move to the Scottish club stating that though moving to a large foreign club would be a dream move, moving at 16 years of age was too young and that staying at FCN would be better for his development.

David Jensen has an older brother Daniel Jensen, a former FCN defender who also played for FC Fredericia.

Senior career

Nordsjælland
David Jensen was promoted to reserve goalkeeper as backup to first choice Jesper Hansen in 2010. On 2 August 2011, he signed a new contract with FCN, keeping him at the club until 2014. On 31 August 2011, Jensen made his senior debut in goal against hometown team Hillerød Fodbold in the second round of the Danish Cup, keeping a clean sheet with a 5–0 win. He would play his second match for the senior team in the following round of the Danish Cup on 21 September, in a 2–0 win over 1st Division side FC Hjørring. David Jensen would go on to make his Superliga debut on 24 September, coming on as a 44th-minute substitute for the injured Jesper Hansen, in a 1–0 loss to AGF. He would make his first league start on 2 October, in a 1–0 win over SønderjyskE, but had to come off at half time because of an injury to his knees from a collision with another player. He was expected to be out of action anywhere between four and six weeks. After not featuring regularly for Nordsjælland, Jensen was loaned to FC Fredericia and AB during the 2012/13 season. Upon returning to the club he would become the first choice keeper for the next three seasons.

Utrecht
Jensen transferred to Utrecht of the Eredivisie on 28 July 2016. He made his first appearance for the club as an injury substitution in a 3–3 draw against Feyenoord. In his first season at the club he helped Utrecht to a fourth place finish in the Eredivisie and qualification to the Europa League. In 2017, Jensen recorded his first clean sheet in European competition during the 2017–18 Europa League Second Qualifying Round in a 0–0 draw against Maltese club, Valletta.

New York Red Bulls
On 29 January 2020, Jensen signed with the New York Red Bulls of Major League Soccer. Jensen started the club's first game of the 2020 season and earned the victory over FC Cincinnati, 3–2.

On 7 July 2022, it was announced that Jensen and New York mutually agreed to terminate his contract.

Westerlo (loan)
On 17 June 2021, the Red Bulls announced that they had loaned David Jensen to Belgian First Division B side K.V.C. Westerlo. Jensen made his debut and earned his first clean sheet for Westerlo on August 15, 2021, during a 2-0 victory over Excelsior Virton. Jensen helped to lead Westerlo to the 2021–22 Belgian First Division B championship, playing 26 of 28 matches during the season.

İstanbulspor
On 30 July 2022, Jensen signed a two-year contract with newly promoted Süper Lig club İstanbulspor.

International career
Jensen was part of the Danish under-20 team that won the 2011 Milk Cup in Northern Ireland.

Career statistics

Club

Honours
Nordsjælland
Danish Superliga: 2011–12

Westerlo
Belgian First Division B: 2021–22

Denmark U20
 Milk Cup Elite: 2011

References

External links
 
  
 Profile at DBU.dk 

1992 births
Living people
People from Hillerød Municipality
Sportspeople from the Capital Region of Denmark
Danish men's footballers
Denmark youth international footballers
Denmark under-21 international footballers
Association football goalkeepers
FC Nordsjælland players
Akademisk Boldklub players
FC Utrecht players
Hillerød Fodbold players
New York Red Bulls players
İstanbulspor footballers
Danish Superliga players
Danish 1st Division players
Eredivisie players
Eerste Divisie players
Major League Soccer players
Challenger Pro League players
Süper Lig players
Danish expatriate men's footballers
Expatriate footballers in the Netherlands
Expatriate footballers in Belgium
Expatriate soccer players in the United States
Expatriate footballers in Turkey